Cainocrinidae is a family of echinoderms belonging to the order Isocrinida.

Genera:
 Nielsenicrinus Rasmussen, 1961 
 Teliocrinus Döderlein, 1912

References

Isocrinida
Echinoderm families